The Mnet Asian Music Award for Best Ballad/R&B Performance was an award presented annually by CJ E&M Pictures (Mnet) from 1999 to 2009.

It was first awarded at the 1st Mnet Asian Music Awards ceremony held in 1999; Jo Sungmo won the award for his ballad performance in "For Your Soul", and it is given in honor for the artist/s with the best ballad performance in the music industry. The next year, the category branched out into two separate categories — Best Ballad Performance and Best R&B Performance. Later in the 10th Mnet Asian Music Awards in 2008, the two categories were joined together once again, and continued to be given until the 11th Mnet Asian Music Awards in 2009 wherein Kim Tae-woo received the last award for his performance in "Love Rain".

History

Winners and nominees

 Each year is linked to the article about the Mnet Asian Music Awards held that year.

Multiple awards for Best Ballad/R&B Performance
The following lists the artist(s) who received multiple awards for Best Ballad/R&B Performance from 1999 to 2009.

Notes

Sources

References

External links
 Mnet Asian Music Awards official website

MAMA Awards